The Hastings Micropolitan Statistical Area, as defined by the United States Census Bureau, is an area consisting of two counties in Nebraska, anchored by the city of Hastings.

As of the 2000 census, the μSA had a population of 38,190 (though a July 1, 2009 estimate placed the population at 39,529).

Counties
Adams
Clay

Communities
Places with 20,000 or more inhabitants
Hastings (Principal City)
Places with 1,000 to 2,500 inhabitants
Sutton
Places with 500 to 1,000 inhabitants
Clay Center
Edgar
Harvard
Juniata
Kenesaw
Places with less than 500 inhabitants
Ayr
Deweese
Fairfield
Glenvil
Holstein
Ong
Prosser
Roseland
Saronville
Trumbull

Townships

Ayr
Blaine
Cottonwood
Denver
Edgar
Eldorado
Fairfield
Glenvil
Hanover
Harvard
Highland
Inland
Juniata
Kenesaw
Leicester
Lewis

Little Blue
Logan (Adams County)
Logan (Clay County)
Lone Tree
Lynn
Marshall
Roseland
School Creek
Sheridan
Silver Lake
Spring Ranch
Sutton
Verona
Wanda
West Blue
Zero

Demographics
As of the census of 2000, there were 38,190 people, 14,897 households, and 9,945 families residing within the μSA. The racial makeup of the μSA was 95.10% White, 0.56% African American, 0.35% Native American, 1.36% Asian, 0.03% Pacific Islander, 1.85% from other races, and 0.75% from two or more races. Hispanic or Latino of any race were 4.38% of the population.

The median income for a household in the μSA was $35,710, and the median income for a family was $42,581. Males had a median income of $29,082 versus $20,553 for females. The per capita income for the μSA was $17,589.

See also
Nebraska census statistical areas

References

 
Adams County, Nebraska
Clay County, Nebraska